Mark V. Ronchetti (born October 1, 1973) is an American political candidate and former KRQE meteorologist. A member of the Republican Party, he was a candidate for the U.S. Senate in 2020 and for governor of New Mexico in 2022.

Early life and meteorology career
Ronchetti was born in Dallas in 1973. The grandson of Italian emigrants, Ronchetti grew up in Shelburne, Vermont. He attended Washington State University, graduating with a degree in communications and political science, before moving to Colorado to take a job at a television station. He moved to Albuquerque in 1998 to become a meteorologist for KOAT-TV, then took up another job in Oregon. He returned to New Mexico in 2006 to join KRQE.

Political career

2020 United States Senate election in New Mexico

Ronchetti announced his candidacy for the 2020 U.S. Senate election in New Mexico on January 7, 2020, to succeed retiring incumbent Democratic Senator Tom Udall. Defeating two other contenders in the Republican primary, he lost to Ben Ray Luján, the then-incumbent U.S. Representative for New Mexico's 3rd congressional district, by a 6.1% margin, less than widely expected.

2022 New Mexico gubernatorial election

Ronchetti launched his campaign for New Mexico Governor on October 27, 2021. He defeated State Representative Rebecca Dow, retired U.S. Army National Guard officer Gregory Zanetti, and two other candidates in the Republican primary. Ronchetti lost to incumbent Democratic governor Michelle Lujan Grisham in the general election.

References

External links

|-

1973 births
Living people
New Mexico Republicans
People from Shelburne, Vermont
American meteorologists
Washington State University alumni
Mississippi State University alumni
21st-century American politicians